Gutenstetten is a municipality in the district of Neustadt (Aisch)-Bad Windsheim in Bavaria in Germany.

Mayors

Gerhard Eichner, CSU, since 2014
Helmut Reiß, Independent citizens (Unabhängige Bürger), 2002 - 2014
Robert Maderer, CSU, 1985 - 2002
Lorenz Schneider, CSU, 1972 - 1985

References

Neustadt (Aisch)-Bad Windsheim